The 2022–23 I-League (also known as the Hero I-League for sponsorship reasons) was the 16th season of I-League, first as the second tier of Indian football league system. It was played from 12 November 2022 to 12 March 2023.

After a 4–0 win against Rajasthan United on 4 March 2023, RoundGlass Punjab clinched their second league title and became the first ever club to be promoted to the Indian Super League while Mumbai Kenkre and Sudeva Delhi were relegated to I-League 2.

Changes from last season

Disbanded clubs
 Indian Arrows

Reinstated clubs
Kenkre FC: After being relegated at the end of the 2021–22 I-League season, Kenkre was allowed to participate this season. The closure of the Indian Arrows project played a major part in their reinstatement. The conditions for their reinstatement were an agreement to take in several Arrows players and no travel subsidy for away matches.

Changes in format
Due to the COVID-19 pandemic, the tournament's format was shortened for the last two seasons. From this season, the traditional home and away games format in a double round-robin will return. Each team will play two matches against every other team at home and away. 

The table topper will be declared the league's winner at the end of the season, thereby achieving promotion to 2023–24 Indian Super League, while the two teams with the lowest points will be relegated to 2023–24 I-League 2, and will get a bye to the final round.

Teams
12 teams participated in the 2022–23 season:

Stadiums and locations 
Due to a lack of AFC standard football stadiums available in Rajasthan, Rajasthan United will play their home matches at Ambedkar Stadium, (New Delhi). RoundGlass Punjab FC will play their home matches at Panchkula's Tau Devi Lal Stadium in Haryana. On 22nd October 2022, AIFF chief Kalyan Chaubey inaugurated the new home ground of Sreenidi Deccan, the Deccan Arena.

Personnel and sponsorship

Coaching changes

Transfers

Foreign players

Note: Players in bold has senior international cap(s) for their respective nations.

AIFF allowed a maximum of six foreign players, including one from an AFC-affiliated country per team, but only four can be part of the matchday squad.

League table

Fixtures and results

Positions by round

Results by games

Season statistics

Top scorers 
As of 12 March 2023

Top Indian scorers 
The table includes only the list of top Indian goalscorers with more than 3 goals in this season.

Hat-tricks

Top assists 
As of 12 March 2023

Clean sheets 
As of 12 March 2023

Discipline

Player 
 Most yellow cards: 9
 Melroy Assisi
 Mirjalol Kasimov

 Most red cards: 1
27 players

Club 
 Most yellow cards: 47
Real Kashmir

 Most red cards: 5
Churchill Brothers

Attendances

Overall statistical table

Attendances by home match played

Legend:  

Source: I-League

Broadcasting
The 2022-23 I-League season aired on India's DD Sports and Eurosport HD television channels. It was also available on the Discovery+ mobile app. However, after the start of the league, the broadcast was fraught with problems.

Awards

Hero of the match

Annual awards

See also
 Indian club qualifiers for 2023–24 AFC competitions
 2022–23 Indian Super League
 2022 Durand Cup
 2023 Indian Super Cup
 2022–23 I-League 2

References

 
I-League seasons
1
India
India